General Manuel Serrano Airport  is a closed airport formerly serving Machala, the capital of El Oro Province in Ecuador.

The airport has been replaced by Coronel Artilleria Victor Larrea Airport in Santa Rosa,  to the south.

See also

Transport in Ecuador
List of airports in Ecuador

References

Defunct airports in Ecuador
Airports in Ecuador
Buildings and structures in El Oro Province